George Doherty Johnston (May 30, 1832 – December 8, 1910) was a brigadier general in the Confederate States Army during the American Civil War.

Early life
George Doherty Johnston was born in Hillsborough, North Carolina. In 1834, his father moved the family to Greensboro, Alabama, where he died less than a year later. His mother then moved the family to Marion, Alabama. Johnston received his education from private tutors before attending Howard College.

He then studied law at Cumberland School of Law at Cumberland University in Lebanon, Tennessee. After graduation, he returned home and began his practice in Marion. Johnson was elected mayor of Marion in 1856 and to the state legislature in 1857.

Civil War
Johnston joined the Confederate Army as second lieutenant of Company G of the 4th Alabama Infantry Regiment. Johnston fought with this unit at the First Battle of Bull Run. In January 1862, Johnston was commissioned major of the 25th Alabama Infantry Regiment. In September 1863 he was promoted to colonel of the same regiment.

Johnston was wounded in the leg at the Battle of Ezra Church two days after promotion to brigadier general. He was on crutches during the Franklin-Nashville Campaign and he took command of Brigadier General William Andrew Quarles' Brigade following the Battle of Franklin. Johnston took part in every battle of the Army of Tennessee from the Battle of Shiloh to the Battle of Bentonville.

Post-war career
Johnston served as commandant of cadets at The University of Alabama following the War. He then moved to South Carolina to serve as superintendent of the South Carolina Military Academy (now The Citadel). He was appointed by President Grover Cleveland to the position of United States Civil Service Commissioner. He was elected to the state senate after returning to live in Tuscaloosa, Alabama.

Death
Johnston died in Tuscaloosa on December 8, 1910, and is buried at Greenwood Cemetery in Tuscaloosa.

See also

List of American Civil War generals (Confederate)

Notes

References
 Eicher, John H., and David J. Eicher, Civil War High Commands. Stanford: Stanford University Press, 2001. .
 Sifakis, Stewart. Who Was Who in the Civil War. New York: Facts On File, 1988. .
 Warner, Ezra J. Generals in Gray: Lives of the Confederate Commanders. Baton Rouge: Louisiana State University Press, 1959. .

External links

The Citadel Archives: Johnston, George Doherty, 1832-1910
George Doherty Johnston papers, University Libraries Division of Special Collections, The University of Alabama

Alabama state senators
Confederate States Army generals
Cumberland University alumni
Mayors of places in Alabama
People from Hillsborough, North Carolina
People of Alabama in the American Civil War
People of North Carolina in the American Civil War
Presidents of The Citadel, The Military College of South Carolina
University of Alabama faculty
1832 births
1910 deaths
19th-century American politicians